Lior Schleien  (born 1 July 1978) is an Israeli television producer and host.

Early life
Lior Schleien was born in 1978 in Tel Aviv, Israel to Jewish parents of Lithuanian descent. He holds law degrees from Tel Aviv University.

Career
He started his television career in 2002, by writing and hosting a satire segment on Yair Lapid's talk show. He later joined the writing staff of Eretz Nehederet and since 2004 he's been creating, producing and hosting his own shows, including Tonight ("HaLayla") which won the Israeli Academy Award for Best Talk Show.

He is the creator and host of the prime time comedy and satire TV show Matzav Ha'Uma.  President Shimon Peres, Prime Minister Benjamin Netanyahu and Joan Rivers (in a special episode which was taped in New York), were some of the guests on the show, which won the Israeli Academy Award for Best Comedy Show twice, in 2012–2013, and its 7th season, which ended in April 2014, received average ratings of 24%.

In 2011, he created, produced and hosted When Will The Cops Come?– The Freedom Of Speech Prom ("Matay Yavo Shoter? - Mesibat Sium Hofesh Habituy"), a gathering of comedians and media personalities in protest against new laws of the Israeli government that they viewed as restricting the freedom of speech. In the event, which took place in Tel Aviv, every speaker was allocated 5 minutes to say anything on his mind, without reprisal, in the eleventh hour before the new laws were enacted.

In 2013, he was chosen by Ha'aretz Newspaper as the 4th most influential person on Israeli Television.

Personal life
He is the life partner of Merav Michaeli, a Member of the Israeli Parliament and leader of the Israeli Labor Party  . He is an Atheist.

References

1978 births
Living people
People from Tel Aviv
Tel Aviv University alumni
Israeli television producers
Israeli television presenters
Israeli people of Lithuanian-Jewish descent
Israeli atheists
Jewish atheists